Thomas Howard, 4th Duke of Norfolk,  (Kenninghall,  Norfolk, 10 March 1536Tower Hill, London, 2 June 1572) was an English nobleman and politician. He was a second cousin of Queen Elizabeth I through her maternal grandmother, and held many high offices during the earlier part of her reign.

Norfolk was the son of the poet, soldier and politician Henry Howard, Earl of Surrey. He is believed to have commissioned Thomas Tallis, probably in 1567, to compose his renowned motet in forty voice-parts, Spem in alium.

He was executed for his role in the Ridolfi plot.

Early life, family, and religion

Thomas was born at Kenninghall, Norfolk on 10 March 1536, being the eldest son of Henry Howard, Earl of Surrey and his wife Lady Frances de Vere. His grandparents on his father's side were Thomas Howard, 3rd Duke of Norfolk, and Elizabeth Stafford. His maternal grandparents were John de Vere, 15th Earl of Oxford, and Elizabeth Trussell. His siblings were Jane, Henry, Katherine, and Margaret. His father, being the eldest son of the Duke of Norfolk and heir to the dukedom, was destined to become the future 4th Duke but that all changed at the end of 1546 when Surrey quartered the royal arms of Edward the Confessor on his own coat of arms, incurring the fury of Henry VIII. The king was also convinced that the Howards planned to usurp the crown from his son, the future Edward VI. Consequently, he ordered the arrest of both Surrey and his father on treason charges. They were sentenced to death and Surrey was executed in January 1547. The 3rd Duke was saved from being executed by the death of Henry VIII the day before that appointed for the beheading, and also by the Privy Council's decision not to inaugurate the new reign with bloodshed; but he remained imprisoned in the Tower of London with most of his property and titles forfeit to the Crown. 

After Surrey's death, Mary Howard, Duchess of Richmond, took care of her nephews and employed John Foxe, the Protestant martyrologist to educate them. Despite losing his position as tutor of the Howard children six years later, Foxe remained an important recipient of Thomas's patronage for the rest of Howard's life. Although Thomas and his siblings received a Protestant education, they were Catholic as were the majority of his family, who remained loyal to Catholicism during the Reformation. His father fell out of favour in part because he was a Catholic, and his grandfather, imprisoned for the same reasons that led to Surrey's execution, remained in the Tower throughout the reign of Edward VI, being released and pardoned in 1553 after the accession to the throne of the Catholic Queen Mary I. As soon as the 3rd Duke was released, he dismissed Foxe, who soon went into exile in various European countries to escape anti-Protestant measures taken by Queen Mary, and reassigned the education of both Thomas and his brother Henry to the conservative and Catholic priest John White, who shortly afterwards was chosen to be the new Bishop of Lincoln.

Career

In July 1554 Howard became first gentleman of the chamber to Mary's consort, Philip II of Spain, and in November he was with them at the opening of parliament.  Because his father predeceased his grandfather, Thomas became heir to the Dukedom of Norfolk, receiving in 1553 the courtesy title of Earl of Surrey, a subsidiary title of the Dukes of Norfolk, when Queen Mary restored to the Howard family all titles and properties that had been forfeited by them six years earlier. After the death of his grandfather in August 1554, Thomas succeeded to the dukedom as 4th Duke. However, since he was still a minor at the time, he could not start managing his properties, which consisted of extensive estates including fifty-six manors. Once he came of age, the duke was able to administer of all his estates, becoming one of the richest landowners in England.

To be a Catholic disguised as a Protestant so as not to attract the attention of the authorities was not unusual during the turbulent years of the Reformation. Many English Catholics took a stance of publicly showing themselves as Protestants, but secretly and privately professing and maintaining their Catholic faith. Howard was a second cousin of Queen Elizabeth I through her maternal grandmother, Lady Elizabeth Howard, and he was trusted with public office despite his family's history and leanings towards the Catholic Church.

Norfolk, as Earl Marshal of England, was in charge of organising Elizabeth I's coronation on 15 January 1559, and the celebrations following. After that he was the Queen's Lieutenant in the North. From February to July 1560, he was commander of the English army in Scotland in support of the Protestant Lords of the Congregation, who opposed the Catholic and pro-French government of the regent, Mary of Guise. He negotiated the February 1560 Treaty of Berwick by which the Congregation invited English assistance, and after the Treaty of Edinburgh was signed in July of that year he was able to return to court.

He is believed to have commissioned Thomas Tallis in 1567 to compose his famous motet in forty-parts, Spem in alium.

Norfolk was the Principal of the commission held at York in October 1568 to hear evidence against Mary, Queen of Scots, presented by Regent James Stewart, 1st Earl of Moray, including the casket letters.

Legal troubles and execution

Having lost his third wife and despite having presided at the York commission, Norfolk planned what would have been his fourth marriage, to Mary, Queen of Scots, who had been a prisoner in England since she fled Scotland in May 1568, after being defeated at the Battle of Langside. Many Catholics considered Mary to be the rightful queen of England due to Elizabeth being a Protestant, and also because the Catholic Church did not regard the marriage of Elizabeth's parents, Henry VIII and Anne Boleyn, as valid. This represented a serious threat to Elizabeth. Both the Scottish statesman William Maitland of Lethington and the Bishop of Ross, John Lesley, Mary's advisor and chief agent, were in favour of the duke's marriage to the Scottish queen, and Mary herself consented to it, but Norfolk was initially reluctant to bring about political and religious change. At first he showed little sympathy for Mary, but his attitude changed after Maitland suggested that he might marry her. Norfolk saw in this proposal not only the means to solve the succession crisis which had plagued England ever since Elizabeth’s accession, given her subsequent reluctance to marry and produce an heir, but also an opportunity for his own social aggrandisement. Politically, too, it would give him an advantage at court, as he was by now the bitter rival of Elizabeth’s favourite, Robert Dudley, Earl of Leicester, and an enemy of William Cecil, Lord Burghley. The marriage scheme with Mary was supported by most of the Catholic nobility, and some assumed that the duke was willing to lead a revolt against Elizabeth. In November 1569 the Rising of the North broke out, organised in part by Charles Neville, 6th Earl of Westmorland, Thomas' brother-in-law. Howard briefly became involved in the rebellion, hoping that if it succeeded, he would secure the release of Mary, who was then being held captive in Tutbury Castle. It is still debated whether this rebellion actually aimed to overthrow Elizabeth and whether Mary even knew about it beforehand. After initial successes, Westmorland and the co-leader of the revolt, Thomas Percy, 7th Earl of Northumberland, were forced to escape to Scotland when Elizabeth sent forces north under Thomas Radclyffe, 3rd Earl of Sussex, with the aim of quelling the rebellion. Norfolk tried to stop the revolt when he saw that it was going to fail, but Elizabeth ordered his arrest after receiving the news that the rising had taken place.

However, in August 1570, the rebellion having by then been put down, Norfolk was released for lack of evidence since his intention to marry Mary, though objectionable to Elizabeth, was not in itself treasonable. There was also not enough evidence at that time to add more accusations against the duke, since he did not directly participate in the revolt in the north. Shortly after Howard was released, Roberto Ridolfi, an Italian merchant and banker who lived in London at the time, contacted the duke to negotiate his participation in the eponymous plot to free Mary, put her on the English throne and thus restore Catholicism in England. Ridolfi relied on the Papal Bull Regnans In Excelsis issued in February of that same year, which excommunicated Elizabeth and urged Catholics to do all they could to depose her, as a reason for setting up the plot, in which Spanish intelligence was also going to participate. Howard had also already come into contact with Philip II of Spain regarding a proposed invasion of England by troops commanded by the Fernando Alvarez de Toledo y Pimentel, 3rd Duke of Alba, based in the Netherlands at that time. During the negotiations, Norfolk gave Ridolfi verbal assurances that he was a Catholic, despite the fact that he had been educated as a Protestant. After some hesitation, he placed himself at the head of the conspirators; and in return for his services he asked the Spanish king “to approve of my own marriage with the Queen of Scots.“.  Elizabeth's intelligence network soon learned of the existence of the plot, which quickly failed; Norfolk’s treachery was revealed to Burghley, and in September 1571 he was again arrested. Initially he denied his involvement in the plot, but later admitted it.

The evidence to prosecute Norfolk was now much stronger than in 1569-70, as it was clear that he had been involved in a conspiracy to overthrow and assassinate Elizabeth. At his trial on 16 January 1572, which lasted twelve hours, Norfolk pleaded his innocence. However a jury of twenty-six of his fellow nobles, including Burghley and Leicester, unanimously found him guilty of treason, and he was sentenced to death.

Having been condemned by a jury of his peers, it was reasonable to suppose that his execution would quickly follow. Indeed, it was rumoured that he was to be executed on the last day of January, whereupon crowds flocked to the Tower. Elizabeth, torn between the demands of justice on the one hand and Norfolk’s ‘nearness of blood [and] … his superiority of honour’ on the other, did not sign the warrant until 9 February, and on the next day she countermanded her instructions. She did the same thing a fortnight later, to the dismay of Burghley and the Privy Council. They insisted that Parliament be assembled to debate the urgent threat posed by Norfolk and Mary, although parliaments normally met only once every three or four years and the previous parliament had been dissolved only ten months earlier.

The new parliament, the fourth of Elizabeth’s reign, assembled on 8 May 1572. Over the course of the next three weeks, Burghley and the Council used their spokesmen in the Commons to press the case for executing Norfolk. In late May, two members went so far as to observe that by failing to execute the duke, the queen was demonstrating that she believed the guilty verdict to be incorrect, which ‘dishonoureth the nobles that have condemned him’. Initially Elizabeth refused to relent. Indeed, as late as 21 May Leicester remarked that he could ‘see no likelihood’ that Norfolk would be executed. However, Elizabeth's opinion suddenly changed when she came up against strong parliamentary pressure calling for the executions of both Norfolk and Mary. As Stephen Alford has observed, Norfolk’s execution ‘was the political price Elizabeth had to pay to save the Scottish Queen’. Even so, the queen was determined that the decision to execute the duke should be seen to be hers rather than Parliament's. On Saturday 31 May the Crown's spokesmen in the Commons persuaded the lower house, with great difficulty, to postpone petitioning the queen to execute the duke until the following Monday (2 June), ‘in hope to hear news before that time’. That hint was well taken, as Norfolk finally went to the block less than one hour before the Commons reassembled.

Shortly before seven in the morning on 2 June 1572 Norfolk was led to a specially erected scaffold on Tower Hill, accompanied by his former tutor Foxe and by Alexander Nowell, Dean of St Paul’s. He addressed the crowd which had assembled to witness his execution. Despite admitting that he deserved to die, he declared himself to be partly innocent, whereupon he was interrupted by an official, who warned him that he should not try to clear himself, having been ‘tried as honourably as any nobleman hath ever been in this land’. Urged to wind up quickly, as ‘the hour is passed’, Norfolk ended his speech by denying that he was a Catholic, as was commonly believed. After bidding a tearful farewell to Foxe and Nowell, and forgiving the executioner, the duke removed his doublet and laid his head on the block. Before a silent crowd, which had been urged not to shout out to avoid ‘frighting’ his soul, Norfolk’s head was severed with a single stroke.

Norfolk was the first nobleman to be executed during Elizabeth's reign, being the first since Henry Grey, Duke of Suffolk, father of Lady Jane Grey, was executed early in Mary I's reign. Equally striking was that he was the premier nobleman of England, the queen’s second cousin and a leading member of the Privy Council. Until recently, he had also been much admired by Elizabeth and Burghley. Indeed, in 1565 Burghley had described Norfolk as ‘wise, just, modest, careful’ and, despite his youth – he was then aged 29 – ‘a father and stay to this country’. In the immediate aftermath of his execution, Elizabeth was reportedly ‘somewhat sad’ at the duke’s death.  Norfolk was buried in Chapel of St. Peter ad Vincula, in the Tower of London. 

Norfolk's lands and titles were forfeit, although much of the estate was later restored to his sons. The title of Duke of Norfolk was restored, four generations later, to his great-great-grandson Thomas Howard.

Marriages and issue

First wife

   

      
In March 1555, the young duke married his first wife Mary FitzAlan, daughter and heir of Henry FitzAlan, 12th Earl of Arundel. His marriage to Mary brought as dowry many of the extensive properties Mary's father owned in Sussex, including Arundel Castle, the family's principal home FitzAlan. Those FitzAlan properties were merged with Howard's properties in Norfolk. Mary died in August 1557, married for just over two years, having given birth shortly before her death to her only son, who was to become the heir to the title and all of the FitzAlan family estates in Arundel:

 Philip Howard, 13th Earl of Arundel (28 June 155719 October 1595), who on his maternal grandfather's death in 1580, became 13th Earl of Arundel. For remaining loyal to Catholicism, he was imprisoned in the Tower of London in 1585, remaining there until his death from natural causes in October 1595. Shortly after his death he was declared a Catholic martyr, and was canonised in 1970, being one of the so-called Forty Martyrs of England and Wales. His tomb and sanctuary are in Arundel Cathedral.

It is from this marriage that their descendants, the modern dukes of Norfolk, derive their surname of 'FitzAlan-Howard' and their seat in Arundel. Although Lady Mary FitzAlan's funeral effigy is in St Michael the Archangel's Church in Framlingham, she was not buried there, but in St. Clement Danes Church, Temple Bar, London. Decades later, based on the provisions of the will of her grandson Thomas Howard, 14th Earl of Arundel, her remains were transferred to Fitzalan Chapel in Arundel.

Second wife

In early 1558, Norfolk was betrothed to Margaret Audley, widow of Sir Henry Dudley and daughter of Thomas Audley, 1st Baron Audley of Walden and his second wife Elizabeth Grey. Thus Margaret was a first cousin of Mary FitzAlan. In order for the marriage to Margaret Audley to take place under Catholic canon law, a dispensation had to be requested from Pope Paul IV due to the close relationship between Thomas' first wife and Audley. Howard sent lawyers to Rome to negotiate obtaining the dispensation, but the Holy See was notorious for its delays and costs where dispensations were concerned. Due to these delays, added also to the fact that in November of that same year Queen Mary died and was succeeded by Queen Elizabeth, who began to restore Protestantism, the marriage was celebrated without the dispensation. It was ratified by Parliament in March 1559.
 

Norfolk's children by his marriage to Margaret were:
 Thomas Howard, 1st Earl of Suffolk;
 Lord William Howard, ancestor of the Earls of Carlisle;
 Lady Elizabeth Howard (died in childhood);
 Lady Margaret Howard

Margaret Audley Howard's tomb with effigy is in St Michael the Archangel's Church, Framlingham, Suffolk.

Third wife

After Margaret's death in January 1563, Norfolk married Elizabeth Leyburne (15364 September 1567), widow of Thomas Dacre, 4th Baron Dacre of Gillesland and daughter of Sir James Leyburn. They had no children.

Norfolk's three sons by his first two wives, Philip, Thomas and William, married, respectively, Anne, Margaret, and Elizabeth Dacre. The Dacre sisters were the daughters of Elizabeth Leyburne by her marriage to Thomas Dacre and were therefore stepsisters to Norfolk's sons.

Elizabeth died in September 1567, shortly after giving birth to a baby, whose sex is not known and who also died.

Depictions
Thomas Howard appears as a character in the Philippa Gregory novels The Virgin's Lover and The Other Queen, and in the novel I, Elizabeth by Rosalind Miles.
A highly fictionalised version of the duke, played by Christopher Eccleston, is in the 1998 film Elizabeth. 
Another version of the duke is in the BBC mini-series The Virgin Queen, played by Kevin McKidd.
In the Channel 4 documentary Elizabeth (2000) presented by David Starkey, the duke is portrayed by actor John Gully.

References

Further reading 

  papers from Norfolk's treason trial 1568–1572.

|-

|-

1536 births
1572 deaths
16th-century English nobility
People from Breckland District
304
303
Earls Marshal
Barons Mowbray
16
Thomas Howard, 04th Duke of Norfolk
Knights of the Garter
Lord-Lieutenants of Buckinghamshire
Lord-Lieutenants of Norfolk
People executed under the Tudors for treason against England
Howard, Thomas
16th-century English politicians
People convicted under a bill of attainder
Executions at the Tower of London
Prisoners in the Tower of London
Executed English people
People executed by Tudor England by decapitation
People executed under Elizabeth I
Burials at the Church of St Peter ad Vincula
English politicians convicted of crimes
Court of Mary I of England